The Albany–Stony Brook football rivalry, also known as the Battle for the Golden Apple and the Empire Clash is an American college football rivalry between the Albany Great Danes and the Stony Brook Seawolves. Both teams represent university centers of the State University of New York, and since 2013 have competed together as football-only members of the Colonial Athletic Association (CAA). The two teams have met 23 times on the football field, with Albany currently holding a 13–10 edge in the all-time series. Albany leads the series 10–9 since 1999, when both programs moved up to Division I.

Since 2013, when both programs joined the CAA together, they have been meeting yearly as part of their conference schedule. The rivalry game was coined the "Empire Clash" in 2013 during their first CAA conference game against each other. Starting in 2015, the winner of the game is awarded The Golden Apple Trophy. The game is traditionally played on the final week of the regular season.

Albany plays home games at Bob Ford Field at Tom & Mary Casey Stadium (capacity 8,500, grass surface, located in Albany, NY) and Stony Brook plays home games at Kenneth P. LaValle Stadium (capacity 12,300, artificial turf surface, located in Stony Brook, NY).

History 
The winner of each year's game is awarded the "Golden Apple" trophy. The trophy was first awarded in 2015, when Stony Brook defeated Albany 20–2 at Kenneth P. LaValle Stadium in the final week of the regular season.

Stony Brook and Albany began playing each other regularly beginning in 2013, when both schools joined the Colonial Athletic Association as football-only members. This led to the origin of the "Empire Clash" nickname, as Stony Brook turned to its fanbase to help provide a moniker for the rivalry.

Both Stony Brook head coach Chuck Priore and Albany head coach Greg Gattuso admitted to feeling skeptical about the idea of the Golden Apple trophy when it was first introduced, but have since embraced the importance of its meaning to the teams and their fanbases.

The rivalry game is known to have implications on the FCS playoffs; in 2018, Albany defeated No. 10 Stony Brook 25–23 on a last-second field goal for its first conference win of the season, leading Stony Brook to settle for an at-large berth. In 2019, Albany defeated Stony Brook 31–26 to secure one of the last at-large berths in the playoffs.

Notable games 

In 2011, the two teams met in the first round of the FCS playoffs; it was both Stony Brook's and Albany's first playoff appearance. Albany led 28–10 in the third quarter before Stony Brook scored 21 unanswered points to take a 31–28 lead. Albany drove down to Stony Brook's three-yard line with less than a minute remaining in the fourth quarter before Stony Brook safety Dominick Reyes intercepted Albany quarterback Dan Di Lella in the end zone to secure the win for the Seawolves. The win was Stony Brook's first playoff victory. Stony Brook played in the Big South Conference and Albany played in the Northeast Conference at the time.

Game results

See also 
 List of NCAA college football rivalry games

References

College football rivalries in the United States
Albany Great Danes football
Stony Brook Seawolves football
1995 establishments in New York (state)